Cocodrilos Fútbol Club Lázaro Cárdenas is a football club that plays in the Third Division. It is based in the city of Lázaro Cárdenas, Mexico.

History
The club was founded in August 2017 and from that year began to participate in the Liga TDP. The team officially debuted on September 2, defeating Monarcas Zacapu 3–0. Alexis Casas scored the first goal in the club's history. The team has reached the promotion playoffs in its three full seasons, falling all times in the round of 32.

Stadium
The club plays its home games at the Estadio Deportivo Club Pacífico, located in Lázaro Cárdenas, currently has a capacity for 2,500 spectators. However, in 2020 the stadium expansion process began, which aims to expand its capacity to 12,000 seats by 2022 in a first phase, however, it is expected to reach 25,000 seats within 10 years.

Players

First-team squad

See also
Football in Mexico
Tercera División de México

External links
Liga TDP
Liga MX

References 

Association football clubs established in 2017
Football clubs in Michoacán
2017 establishments in Mexico